Danilo Monteiro Martins (born 16 May 1998) is a Brazilian professional basketball player with Flamengo in the NBB.

References

1998 births
Living people
Brazilian men's basketball players
Flamengo basketball players
Power forwards (basketball)